Cukang Taneuh, which means Soil bridge in Sundanese, is a canyon located in Pangandaran, West Java, Indonesia. Cukang Taneuh is also well known as Green Canyon. Its famous name Green Canyon may have derived from its green water color and its green surrounding. This place is also one of many travel destinations in Indonesia. Its exact location is in Kertayasa village in Cijulang district, Pangandaran regency, approximately 31 km from Pangandaran beach.

This canyon is formed from soil erosion due to million of years Cijulang river flow through caves with stalactites and stalagmites. The river is flanked by two rocky cliffs with exuberant trees above it.

To reach the canyon, visitors have to rent a rowboat from the Ciseureuh dock. The boats operate daily from 7.30am to 4.00pm. The journey takes approximately 30–45 minutes along 3 km to get to the Cukang Taneuh entrance.  The boat can only go as far as this place. To enter the canyon, visitors must swim and wear life-jacket before explore deeper into the canyon.

The shape of the canyon is like the entrance of cave. However, although has a natural shape like the entrance to a cave, it is actually an entrance to an open space inside, where a river flows between two cliff. There is small waterfall at this entrance called Palatar. Several others small waterfalls can be seen falling from the cliffs along the river stream.

The operator of this place also offer some other activities for the tourists, which include body rafting, climbing, swimming, boating and fishing. Besides Cukang Taneuh, there are also other tourist destinations near this location, such as Batukaras and Pangandaran beach.

References 

Canyons and gorges of Asia
Landforms of West Java
Tourist attractions in West Java
Landforms of Indonesia
Landforms of Java